Xiao Tian (born 1955) is a former Chinese fencer and sports administrator. He most recently held the post of the Deputy Director of the General Administration of Sport of China. On June 25, 2015, Xiao Tian was investigated by the Communist Party of China's anti-graft agency. He is the first high-ranking implicated official being examined from sports system after the 18th Party Congress in 2012.

The Chinese government announced in September 2015 that it was to try Xiao Tian for multiple instances of corruption.

Career
Before his political career, Xiao was a fencer in Anhui Fencing Team. In 1977, Xiao Tian went to Beijing Sport University. He attend to National Sports Committee of China (today's State General Administration of Sports) in 1981. In 2005, Xiao became the Deputy Director of State General Administration of Sports.

On May 17, 2015, Xiao Tian sent the outstanding contribution cup to retired hurdler Liu Xiang in Shanghai Golden Grand Prix.

On June 25, 2015, Xiao Tian was placed under investigation by the Party's internal disciplinary body for "serious violations of laws and regulations". His wife, Tian Ye, Deputy Secretary of Chinese Equestrian Association, also was placed under investigation.

On September 24, 2015, Xiao Tian was expelled from the Communist Party. He was sentenced to ten and a half years in prison on December 26, 2016.

References

People from Bengbu
Living people
People's Republic of China politicians from Anhui
Chinese male fencers
Expelled members of the Chinese Communist Party
Chinese politicians convicted of corruption
1955 births
Fencers from Anhui